The 2014–15 Colorado State Rams women's basketball team represented Colorado State University in the 2014–15 college basketball season. The Rams, led by third year head coach Ryun Williams. The Rams played their home games at the Moby Arena and were members of the Mountain West Conference. They finish the season 23–8, 15–3 in Mountain West play to win the regular season championship. They lost in the quarterfinals of the Mountain West Conference women's basketball tournament to San Jose State. As regular season champions who failed to win their conference tournament, they received an automatic big to the Women's National Invitation Tournament where they lost in the first round to Northern Colorado.

Roster

Schedule

|-
!colspan=9 style="background:#00674E; color:#FFC44F;"| Exhibition

|-
!colspan=9 style="background:#00674E; color:#FFC44F;"| Non-Conference Regular Season

|-
!colspan=9 style="background:#00674E; color:#FFC44F;"| Mountain West Regular Season

|-
!colspan=9 style="background:#00674E;"| Mountain West Women's Tournament

|-
!colspan=9 style="background:#00674E;"| 2015 WNIT

See also
2014–15 Colorado State Rams men's basketball team

References 

Colorado State
Colorado State Rams women's basketball seasons
2015 Women's National Invitation Tournament participants
Colorado State Rams
Colorado State Rams